Wellingborough is a constituency represented in the House of Commons of the UK Parliament since 2005 by Peter Bone, a Conservative.

History
This seat was created under the Representation of the People Act 1918.

Political history
Wellingborough's earliest years were left-leaning.  Between 1964 and 2005, the seat has kept on producing examples of bellwether results and rarely showed itself to be safe for more than one government term.  Departing from this are two years where the result has defied the most common result nationwide, by leaning towards the Conservative Party, in 1974 (twice). Since 2010 it has become a safe seat for the conservatives.

In the 2016 EU referendum, Wellingborough voted 62.4% leave (25,679 votes) to 37.6% remain (15,462 votes)

Prominent frontbenchers
Sir Geoffrey Shakespeare was a Lloyd-Georgist National Liberal who served in junior minister roles through much of World War II including, briefly as the Secretary for Overseas Trade in 1940.

The lack of other senior positions is assisted by no majority having been gained by the winner which is in national terms generally shown to be insurmountable, see marginal seat.

Boundaries

1918–1950: The Borough of Higham Ferrers, the Urban Districts of Finedon, Irthlingborough, Raunds, Rushden, and Wellingborough, the Rural District of Wellingborough, and in the Rural District of Thrapston the parishes of Chelveston cum Caldecott, Hargrave, and Stanwick.

1950–1974: The Borough of Higham Ferrers, the Urban Districts of Irthlingborough, Raunds, Rushden, and Wellingborough, the Rural District of Wellingborough, and in the Rural District of Oundle and Thrapston the civil parishes of Chelveston cum Caldecott and Hargrave.

1974–1983: The Borough of Higham Ferrers, the Urban Districts of Irthlingborough, Oundle, Raunds, Rushden, and Wellingborough, and the Rural Districts of Oundle and Thrapston, and Wellingborough.

1983–2010: The Borough of Wellingborough, and the District of East Northamptonshire wards of Higham Ferrers, Rushden East, Rushden North, Rushden South, and Rushden West.

2010–present: The Borough of Wellingborough wards of Brickhill, Castle, Croyland, Finedon, Great Doddington and Wilby, Hemmingwell, Irchester, North, Queensway, Redwell East, Redwell West, South, Swanspool, and Wollaston, and the District of East Northamptonshire wards of Higham Ferrers, Rushden East, Rushden North, Rushden South, and Rushden West.

The constituency is named after the town of Wellingborough and covers most of the former Borough of Wellingborough local government district. The constituency also includes Rushden and Higham Ferrers, a small town in the neighbouring local government district of East Northamptonshire.

Higham Ferrers was itself a former borough constituency until its abolition as one of the rotten boroughs in 1832.

Constituency profile
Strengths in local industries here or in neighbouring Northampton and Kettering include in printing, logistics and distribution, automotive (assembly and design), construction, food processing and advanced engineering sectors.  Despite this a decline in the traditional local industries such as quarrying, furniture making and textiles pushes workless claimants who were registered jobseekers in November 2012 higher than the national (and regional) average of 3.8%, at 4.5% of the population based on a statistical compilation by The Guardian.

Members of Parliament

Elections

Elections in the 2020s

Elections in the 2010s

1: After nominations were closed, Garvie was suspended from the Labour Party after he was convicted of fraud after buying £900 of train tickets with a closed bank account. He still appeared on ballot papers as Labour.

Elections in the 2000s

Elections in the 1990s

Elections in the 1980s

Elections in the 1970s

Elections in the 1960s

Elections in the 1950s

Elections in the 1940s

Elections in the 1930s

Elections in the 1920s

Elections in the 1910s

See also
List of parliamentary constituencies in Northamptonshire

Notes

References

Sources
 A history of Britain's parliamentary constituencies / edited by Jacques A. Arnold. The constituencies of the county of Northamptonshire..

Parliamentary constituencies in Northamptonshire
Constituencies of the Parliament of the United Kingdom established in 1918
Wellingborough
Rushden